The Offspring Collection is a box set containing four discs from American punk rock band The Offspring. The set contains four CD singles ("Come Out and Play," "Self Esteem," "Gotta Get Away," and "Pretty Fly (For a White Guy)"). In addition, the box set also includes 2 buttons; one reading "Pretty Fly", and the other reading "For A White Guy". It also includes an Offspring sticker, and a "31" temporary tattoo, as well as an XL T-shirt that has "Pretty fly" on the front with a small cartoon character and "Offspring 31" on the back. It is not an official release by The Offspring.

Track listing

"Come Out and Play"

"Self Esteem"

"Gotta Get Away"

"Pretty Fly (for a White Guy)"

Personnel
Dexter Holland – Rhythm Guitar, lead vocals
Noodles – Lead Guitar, backing vocals
Greg K. – Bass, backing vocals
Ron Welty – Drums

References

1999 compilation albums
The Offspring compilation albums